Arab cinema or Arabic cinema refers to the film industry of the Arab world which depends for most of its production on the Egyptian cinema.

Overview 
There is no single description of Arab cinema since it includes films from various countries and cultures of the Arab world and therefore does not have one form, structure, or style.

Arab cinema mostly includes films made in Egypt, Lebanon, Syria, Iraq, Kuwait, Algeria, Morocco, and Tunisia; however, by definition, it also includes Bahrain, Djibouti, Jordan, Libya, Oman, Palestine, Qatar, Saudi Arabia, Somalia, Sudan, United Arab Emirates, and Yemen.

In its inception, Arab cinema was mostly an imitation of Western cinema. However, it has and continues to constantly change and evolve, as each country in the region has its own unique characteristics and identifiable brand of cinema.

Egypt, in particular, is a pioneer among Arab countries in the field of cinema. A sustained film industry was able to emerge in Egypt when other parts of the Arab world had only been able to sporadically produce feature-length films due to limited financing. As such, Arabic cinema is dominated by films from Egypt, where three quarters of all Arab movies are produced. According to film critic and historian Roy Armes, Lebanese cinema is the only other cinema in the Arabic-speaking region that could amount to a national cinema.

While Egyptian and Lebanese films have a long history of production, most other Arab countries did not witness film production until after independence. Even at the end of the 20th century, most film productions in countries like Bahrain, Libya, Saudi Arabia, Sudan, and the United Arab Emirates are limited to television or short films.

Elsewhere in North Africa and the Middle East, film production was scarce until the late 1960s and early 1970s, when some filmmakers began to receive funding and financial assistance from state organizations. It was during the post-independence era, when Arab cinema in most countries started. Most films produced at that time were funded by the state and contained a nationalistic dimension. These films helped to advance certain social causes such as independence and other social, economic and political agendas.

There is increased interest in films originating in the Arab world. For example, films from Lebanon, Algeria, Morocco, Palestine, Syria, and Tunisia have been shown more often in local film festivals and repertoire theaters than during the late 1900s.

Arab cinema has explored many topics from politics, colonialism, tradition, modernity and social taboos. It has also attempted to escape from its earlier tendency to mimic and rely on Western film styles. In fact, colonization did not only influence Arab films, but it also had an impact on Arab movie theaters. Also, the portrayal of women became an important aspect. Arab woman shaped a great portion of the film industry in the Arab world by employing their cinematic talents in improving the popularity of Arab films.

However, the production of Arab cinema has also experienced decline, and filmmakers in the Middle East have been trying to "face up to their reality".

Origins  
Full-length feature films began to be produced locally in the Arab world after the 1920s. For instance, the Syrian film  (The Innocent Accused), presented in 1928,  (The Adventures of Ilyas Mabruk) in Lebanon in 1929, the Egyptian film Layla in 1927. At that time, the process of inserting sound into movies used to be done in Paris, and Egypt was only able to produce two sound films, one titled  (Sons of Aristocrats) and the other  (The Song of the Heart). Although these films were produced in the Arab world, they mostly were directed, produced, or showed artistic influence from foreigners or immigrants.

Film production in Arab cinema 
Arab cinema did not flourish before the national independence of each of them, and even after, the films production of Arab cinema was restricted to short-length films. However, there were exceptions for some of them. For example, Egypt scored the highest number in producing films and produced more than 2,500 feature films. During the 1950s and 1960s Lebanon produced 180 feature films. Two full-length Kuwaiti films were produced at the end of 1970s, and a full-length Bahraini film was produced in 1989. Syria produced around 150 films, Tunisia approximately 130, 100 films were produced each in Algeria and Iraq, almost 70 in Morocco and the films made in Jordan were less than 12.

Movie theaters in the Arab world 
The influence of films and cinemas on Arabs was due to the effect of the West on the Arab world; therefore, natives were not the owners for the movie theaters that are located in their own lands.

The first cinema in Egypt was built by the French company Pathé in 1906 in Cairo, aside from the cinématographe that was owned by the Lumière Brothers in Alexandria and Cairo. In Tunisia, they had the Omnia Pathé, which did not launch before 1907.

In 1908, a cinema called "Oracle" was opened in Jerusalem by Egyptian Jews. Also in 1908, in some of Algerian cities, cinemas were built in places depending on the population of Europeans who lived there, such as in Oran. Less than 20 years later, most of the Arab countries had more than a theatre for films screening. In Saudi Arabia and North Yemen, cinemas were not accepted or were prohibited because of religious objections. Between the 1960s and 1970s, however, this issue was, in general, solved and accepted by King Faisal of Saudi Arabia. In alliance with the Crown Prince of Saudi Arabia Mohammed bin Salman's vision of 2030, which calls to expand the artistic, cultural, and entertaining fields in the country, there opened the first cinema in Jeddah on 18 April 2018.

Impact of conflict on Egyptian and Palestinian cinema 

The history of the Arab cinema primarily revolved around was impacted by political challenges such as the Egyptian revolution of 1952, defeat by Israel in 1967, and the Palestinian resistance.

During the 1952 Egyptian revolution, the feudalist system was substituted with a nationalist ideology led by the Rais. This new government had impacted the film industry, in which many of the films produced were ‘social realist’ works depicting the real life of Egypt. Many of the films produced by Salah Abou Seif in 1952 were neorealism such as Master Hassan, which portrayed the difficulties of the different classes in Cairo. This system is said to be derived from the Italian neorealism, though it was not very successful as only a few films were produced.

After the Arab nation was defeated by Israel in 1967, an Association of New Cinema was introduced, the representatives of which wrote a manifesto in 1968 calling for "the emergence of a new cinema with deep roots in contemporary Egypt", wherein "It is necessary to establish a real dialogue within the Egyptian culture in order to create new forms". However, the Palestinian resistance has inspired many of the Arab filmmakers since the 1948 to produce films about their struggle. In fact, in 1972, an Association of Palestinian was developed to bring all the Arab filmmakers together whose work was about the Palestinian resistance.

Role of women in Arab cinema 

Women succeeded in representing 6% of the total number of feature filmmakers in the Maghreb during the 1990s, and less in percentages in the Middle East. The first 35mm feature film to be directed by an Algerian woman was Rachida (2002), by director Yamina Bachir-Chouikh.

In the 2000s, the number of women in the film medium increased and was likeable in Lebanon, Morocco, and Tunisia. Arab women directors were more considerable to women's lives in the Arab world. Arab women also pioneered in screenwriting, where such people as Algerian novelists and prize-winning Assia Djebar and Hafsa Zinaï-Koudil made their own feature films, released in 1978 and 1993 respectively.

Women from the Middle East who were interested in filmmaking were cared of since they, who were born during the 1960s and 1970s, were sent to study about this medium in the United States, such as Najwa Najjar from Palestine and Dahna Abourahme from Lebanon, and others who studied Paris, Canada, and New York. Therefore, the European style in their feature films is noticeable, apart from the effect of colonisation. Arab women filmmakers also had an important role in providing sense of civil war traumas that happened during the war, as well as touching on social issues that were specifically related to women, such as sexual abuse.

Arab filmmakers born in the 1960s 
The new generation of filmmakers born in the 1960s had used cinema as a way of expressing their national identity and the political history of their countries, since the Middle East experienced many political upheavals, including wars and invasions. Although these independent filmmakers had their own cinematic approaches, they were heavily influenced by the West, especially by France through European film training and other programs that were offered. These Arab filmmakers produced films concerning issues related to the freedom of expression and the role of women in society. In fact, filmmakers such as Nadia El Fani and Laila Marrakchi made films that were sexually explicit and unlikely to be depicted in public Arabic cinemas. These female filmmakers and many others, especially from Lebanon, Tunisia and Morocco focused on shedding light on women's issues on the Arabic screen. However, Armes believes that "the views of the 2000s generation [of filmmakers] are defined by the pressures and possibilities of globalization.” Many of the Arab independent filmmakers have hybrid identities and the different personal and global references are reflected in their films, which Rizi describes as "transnationality". 

For example, the producer of the Last Friday is Palestinian-Jordanian who was raised in Saudi Arabi and worked in the city of Amman. These cosmopolitan identities of independent Arab filmmakers have given them access to major funding institutions. Further, the rise of new digital technology in the Middle East has aided in the production of documentary films by young filmmakers through the availability of equipment. Thus, the film Five Broken Cameras by a Palestinian director speaks of the influence of these technologies in the region. Apart from documentaries, feature films covered issues of national identity, life in the diaspora and nostalgia, as they were aiming to connect outsiders with the Arab society. For example, the Algerian feature film Bled Number is about an Algerian who left France and returned to Algeria, where his family greeted him with love and support. These Arab filmmakers have reflected the national, political and historical context of their countries in their films and also discussed issues related to criticism, freedom of expression and women's social roles.

Festivals
There are numerous film festivals that have historically been and are held in various parts of the Arab world to both honor and showcase films from the Arab regions, as well as international standouts.

Existing festivals

Defunct or cancelled festivals

Dubai International Film Festival 

The Dubai International Film Festival (DIFF) was an international film festival based in Dubai, United Arab Emirates. Launched in 2004, it aimed to foster the growth of filmmaking in the Arab world. The DIFF is held under the honorary Chairmanship of Ahmed bin Saeed Al Maktoum. It was a not-for-profit cultural event, presented and organized by the Dubai Technology, Electronic Commerce and Media Free Zone Authority.

DIFF presented cinematic excellence from around the world and offers a high-profile platform for aspiring home-grown talent. The Muhr Award for Excellence in Arab Cinema was launched in 2006, with the aim of recognizing Arab filmmakers both regionally and internationally. In 2008, the Muhr Awards for Excellence were expanded to include two separate competitions, the Muhr Arab Awards, and the Muhr AsiaAfrica Awards. It also introduced a new program segment dedicated exclusively to Animation.

Abu Dhabi Film Festival 
The Abu Dhabi Film Festival (ADFF) was another key international film festival in the larger Arab region. Created in 2007, the ceremony was held annually in October in Abu Dhabi, UAE by the Abu Dhabi Authority for Culture and Heritage (ADACH), under the patronage of Sheikh Sultan Bin Tahnoon Al Nahyan, Chairman of the ADACH. The ADFF aimed to encourage and foster the growth of filmmaking in the Arab world by showcasing movies from the region alongside standout productions from prominent international filmmakers. The first festival debuted with 152 movies and 186 screenings shown in five Abu Dhabi venues. A total of 76 feature films and 34 short films from over 35 countries competed for the Black Pearl Awards.

Doha Tribeca Film Festival 
The Doha Tribeca Film Festival (DTFF) was an annual five-day film festival founded in 2009 to promote Arab and international film, and to develop a sustainable film industry in Qatar. The Festival was one of Qatar's largest entertainment events attracting over 50,000 guests in 2010.

DTFF was the annual film festival of the Doha Film Institute, an organisation founded by H.E. Sheikha Al Mayassa bint Hamad bin Khalifa Al-Thani which implements, consolidates and oversees film initiatives in Qatar.

The 3rd annual DTFF was scheduled to take place from 25 to 29 October 2011 at Katara Cultural Village, Doha. Approximately 40 films were to be screened at the festival, within various themed sections, showcasing World and Middle Eastern Cinema.

Support initiatives
In conjunction with the European Audiovisual Entrepreneurs (EAVE) professional training, networking and project development organization, the Dubai International Film Festival in 2010 also began offering to filmmakers the Interchange group of development and co-production workshops earmarked for directors, screenwriters and producers from the larger Arab region.

In 2011, the Abu Dhabi Film Festival launched the SANAD development and post-production fund for cineastes from the Arab world. With the goal of encouraging independent and auteur-based cinema, eligible filmmakers now have access to financial grants, screenwriting and pitch workshops, and personal meetings with industry mentors and experts.

Current state of Arab cinema 
In the 21st century, many Arab filmmakers and cultural commentators are concerned about the current state and production of the Arab cinema. In November 2000, Arab filmmakers from eleven different countries across the Middle East held a meeting to further address this issue and discuss the future of the Arab cinema, as they are of the opinion that Arab cinema has been declining in popularity and quality. In fact, during the meeting, many of the directors, including the Omani, Kuwaiti, Emirati and Saudi participants believed there wasn't any film industry in their country to talk about. According to the Iraqi director, the film industry in his country has been suffering since the 1990s. The Palestinian filmmaker, Elia Suleiman, said that there are no interesting Arab films to watch any more. Moreover, even Egypt, 'the Hollywood of the Arab world' is declining and is unable to compete with Hollywood cinema and the American imported films. As, "the number of domestic productions has dramatically shriveled – from over sixty films a year in the 1960s to a little over a dozen a year today – and even those are being pushed out of theaters by the American imports". One of the solutions, which the Egyptian filmmaker and director of El Medina, Yousry Nasrallah, came up with, is to establish a cinema for screening only Arab films, and he also ensures that there are people who are willing to invest in his project. One of the potential reasons for the decline in the production of the Arab cinema is due to the political conflicts. For example, the Palestinian cinema was introduced in 1976 and has always dealt with politics. Many of the films produced were documentaries about wars and refugee camps. Moreover, filmmakers across the Middle East such as Rashid Masharawi, Ali Nassar and many others began to also develop films on the Palestinian and Israeli conflict.

According to Nana Asfour, the fall of the Arab cinema is partially due to the great restrictions and censorship the Arabs put on directors who produce challenging films such as Ziad Doueiri and Randa Chahal Sabbag and who travel to the West to screen their films. She concludes by saying that "If enough Arab filmmakers follow their [directors'] lead and if enough Arabs learn to appreciate and nurture their domestic talent, Arab cinema could very well find itself a worthy companion to the acclaimed film industry of neighboring Iran."

See also 

Cinema of Egypt
Cinema of Lebanon
Cinema of Syria
Cinema of Jordan
Cinema of Libya
Cinema of Iraq
Cinema of Morocco
Cinema of Algeria
Cinema of Tunisia
Cinema of Saudi Arabia
Cinema of United Arab Emirates
Cinema of Qatar
Cinema of Eritrea
Cinema of Djibouti
Cinema of Somalia
Cinema of Kuwait
Cinema of Bahrain
Cinema of Oman
Cinema of Palestine
Cinema of Yemen
Cinema of Sudan

References

Further reading
Josef Gugler (ed.) Film in the Middle East and North Africa: Creative Dissidence, University of Texas Press and American University in Cairo Press, 2011, 
Josef Gugler (ed.) Ten Arab Filmmakers: Political Dissent and Social Critique, Indiana University Press, 2015,  
Rebecca Hillauer: Encyclopedia of Arab Women Filmmakers, American University in Cairo Press, 2005, 
Laura U. Marks: Hanan al-Cinema: Affections for the Moving Image, MIT Press 2015, 
Viola Shafik: Arab Cinema: History and Cultural Identity, American University in Cairo Press, revised and updated 2015,

External links
 Zenith Arab Film Festival (UK)
 Vox Cinemas UAE
 New Arab cinema tells intimate stories
 Arab films  
 Arab film festival (Australia)

Arab culture
Cinema of Egypt
Cinema of Algeria
Cinema of Saudi Arabia
Cinema of Morocco
Cinema of Lebanon
Cinema of Syria
Cinema of Tunisia
Cinema of Eritrea
Cinema of Djibouti
Cinema of Somalia
Cinema of Bahrain
Cinema of Iraq
Cinema of Kuwait
Cinema of the United Arab Emirates
Cinema by location
Cinema by culture
Cinema of the Arab world
Asian cinema
African cinema